Kaliko Kauahi (born January 11, 1974) is an American actress. She is known for her role as Sandra in NBC's comedy television series Superstore (2015–2021). Additionally, she played the recurring role of Principal Kwan in the Disney Channel series Raven's Home (2018–2019) and has appeared on television programs such as Parks and Recreation.

Early life 
Kauahi was born and raised in Lawai Valley on Kaua'i, Hawai'i's south side. She was a boarding student at Kamehameha Schools in Honolulu. She attended Loyola Marymount University, studying communications and recording arts.

Career 
Kauahi enrolled in acting classes and began pursuing an acting career in her late 20s, saying: "It just took me that long to admit to myself that this is what I wanted to do and to get over the fear." She first appeared in short films, and landed guest roles on television shows such as Modern Family (2011), Parks and Recreation (2013), The Big Bang Theory (2014), and Brooklyn Nine-Nine (2015). In 2015, she was cast in the recurring role of Sandra on NBC's workplace sitcom Superstore. On May 22, 2019, NBC announced she had been promoted to a series regular for season 5; she remained a series regular in the show’s sixth and final season.

She portrayed Principal Kwan in the Disney Channel television series Raven's Home (2018–2019).

Filmography

Film

Television

References

External links
 

Native Hawaiian people
Native Hawaiian actresses
Actresses from Hawaii
American actresses of Japanese descent
21st-century American actresses
Living people
1974 births